John Koontz was an American politician who served as the Secretary of State of Nevada from 1947 to 1973. During his tenure, he established state archives and preserved all the valuable records.

Koontz entered politics in 1920.

In 1973, he resigned from the office.

References

Secretaries of State of Nevada